Mystery Meat may refer to
Mystery meat, food of uncertain origin
"Mystery Meat", an episode of the cartoon series Danny Phantom
Mystery meat navigation, a concept in software development